Chynna Clugston Flores (born August 19, 1975) is a freelance American comic book creator known for her manga-influenced teen comedy series Blue Monday. Based in Coarsegold, Clugston Flores has been drawing comics since 1994 and has worked with  Oni Press, Dark Horse Presents, Double Feature, Action Girl Comics, DC Comics and several digital comics as an editor, penciler, writer, inker, colorist, letterer and cover artist.

Early life
Clugston Flores grew up in Fresno, California and attended the Roosevelt School of the Arts. After her freshman year, she moved to Oakhurst, California and attended Yosemite High School, where she would take inspiration for Blue Monday.

Career

Shortly after graduation, Clugston Flores submitted some of her minicomics to Fantaco, which signed her to write and draw the vampire miniseries Bloodletting. Clugston Flores followed Bloodletting with one-pagers and shorts in Sarah Dyer's Action Girl and Dark Horse Presents, eventually following editor Jamie S. Rich to Oni Press. At Oni, Clugston Flores produced her manga-influenced comic book 'series, Blue Monday, which debuted in 1999 in Oni Double Feature #11. In 2000 Oni published the first Blue Monday miniseries, Blue Monday: The Kids Are Alright.

She was assistant editor for CMX Manga, assistant editor for DC Comics' Wildstorm division until 2011, and an assistant editor for DC Comics working on various titles, editing Looney Tunes, co-editing Tiny Titans, as well as several digital comics in La Jolla, CA until 2011. She eventually moved Blue Monday and Scooter Girl to Image Comics to be re-released and later produce a new segment in 2017.

Awards
Clugston Flores has been nominated for three Eisner Awards for Best Limited Series for Blue Monday (2001), and her participation on Hopeless Savages (2002), and Best Writer/Artist-Humor (2002); The Russ Manning award (2000); and a Harvey Award. Clugston Flores was also nominated for the 2001 Lulu of the Year Award by Friends of Lulu for Blue Monday.

Personal life
Clugston Flores started her career as Chynna Clugston-Major, before her divorce from Guy Major (a colorist and toner on most of her books to this day), and is currently credited under her married name, Chynna Clugston Flores. Clugston Flores holds an interest in Japanese, Irish, and British culture, including mod fashion, britpop, and film. She lives in San Diego, California, with her husband, Jon Flores.

Selected works
In addition to Blue Monday, Clugston Flores's other notable works include:
 Bloodletting — Fantaco/Tundra (1995–1996)
 Hopeless Savages — Clugston Flores illustrated the flashback scenes. Oni Press (2001), .
 Scooter Girl — a miniseries telling the story of two contemporary mods living in California. Oni Press (2003), .
 Ultimate Marvel Team-Up #11 — a story about Peter Parker running into the Ultimate X-Men in a mall.
 "Anew" — a 1940s romance short story in the anthology Four Letter Worlds. Image Comics (2005), .
 Queen Bee — a middle school drama. graphix /Scholastic Press (2005), .
 Strangetown — about a ten-year-old girl named Vanora Finnar who mysteriously washed onto the Oregon shore in 1973. Oni Press (2006)
 Legion of Super-Heroes In The 31st Century — based on the animated version of the DC Comics property, featuring Superman. Johnny DC (2007)
 Lumberjanes/Gotham Academy — A crossover series from BOOM! Studios and DC Comics. BOOM! Studios (2017)

References

External links 
New Wave Zombie (Chynna Clugston Flores's official website)
Chynna Clugston Flores sketch blog
Chynna Clugston Flores on Tumblr
Chynna Clugston Flores on Twitter
Chynna Clugston Flores's personal Instagram account
Chynna Clugston Flores's Art-centric Instagram account
Valenti. Kristy. "Chynna Clugston" The Comics Journal no. 277 (July 11, 2006).
Thompson, Jason. "American Manga" Interview with Chynna Clugston-Major at Pulp magazine; Accessed July 25, 2010.
Comic Book Database Chynna Clugston Flores  

American comics writers
American female comics artists
American women cartoonists
People from Fresno, California
Artists from San Diego
Female comics writers
1975 births
Living people
American cartoonists
21st-century American women